Machupicchu or Machupicchu Pueblo, also known as Aguas Calientes, is a location in Peru situated in the Cusco Region, Urubamba Province. It is the seat of the Machupicchu District. Machupicchu lies at the Vilcanota River. There are many hotels and restaurants for tourists, as well as natural hot baths which gave the town its colloquial Spanish name.

The village of Machupicchu did not exist until the railroad was built, as it was a center for construction workers. It took off after the railroad opened in 1931 and foreign tourists started arriving to visit the Machu Picchu ruins. Enterprising individuals set up businesses serving the tourists, primarily restaurants and small hotels. Those who could afford luxury stayed at the luxury hotel up by the ruins.

Name 
The official name comes from Quechua Machu Pikchu from machu old, old person, pikchu pyramid; mountain; or prominence with a broad base that ends in sharp peaks. The addition of "pueblo" comes from the Spanish word for town. It was formerly called Aguas Calientes meaning "hot waters" or "hot springs".

History
Settled by a few farm families in 1901, the settlement was transformed into a busy railway worker's camp called Maquinachayoq (possibly from Quechua makina (a borrowing from Spanish máquina) machine / locomotive, train, -cha, -yuq suffixes, "the one with a little machine, locomotive or train", Makinachayuq) during the construction of the railroad through there in the late 1920s. The town was the central hub for worker lodging and their equipment until the railway was completed in 1931.

Transport
Machupicchu serves as a terminal for the PeruRail and Inca Rail passenger train service from Cusco. Trains serve locals and tourists arriving from Cusco and Ollantaytambo to visit Machu Picchu. Avenue Pachacutec is the main and only thoroughfare of the town, connecting the baths to the town's main square.

Industry
The Central Machupicchu Hydroelectric Plant (Hidroelectrica) is nearby at the Urubamba River. It generates about 90 MW for the regions of Cusco, Puno, and Apurímac . It was first constructed between 1958 and 1965 and expanded between 1981 and 1985. The plant was damaged by a landslide on 28 February 1998 and ceased operations until 13 July 2001.

Gallery

Twin towns
 Haworth, United Kingdom
 Otama village, Fukushima Prefecture, Japan

See also
 Tourism in Peru
 Wiñay Wayna

References

External links

 Aguas-Calientes.com
 Aguas Calientes at cusco-peru.org
 

Populated places in the Cusco Region
Tourism in Peru